Elections to Newry and Mourne District Council were held on 17 May 1989 on the same day as the other Northern Irish local government elections. The election used five district electoral areas to elect a total of 30 councillors.

Election results

Note: "Votes" are the first preference votes.

Districts summary

|- class="unsortable" align="centre"
!rowspan=2 align="left"|Ward
! % 
!Cllrs
! % 
!Cllrs
! %
!Cllrs
! %
!Cllrs
!rowspan=2|TotalCllrs
|- class="unsortable" align="center"
!colspan=2 bgcolor="" | SDLP
!colspan=2 bgcolor="" | UUP
!colspan=2 bgcolor="" | Sinn Féin
!colspan=2 bgcolor="white"| Others
|-
|align="left"|Crotlieve
|bgcolor="#99FF66"|64.5
|bgcolor="#99FF66"|5
|20.8
|1
|4.2
|0
|10.5
|1
|7
|-
|align="left"|Newry Town
|bgcolor="#99FF66"|47.2
|bgcolor="#99FF66"|4
|10.4
|1
|14.6
|1
|27.8
|1
|7
|-
|align="left"|Slieve Gullion
|bgcolor="#99FF66"|57.1
|bgcolor="#99FF66"|3
|0.0
|0
|39.4
|2
|3.5
|0
|5
|-
|align="left"|The Fews
|bgcolor="#99FF66"|43.5
|bgcolor="#99FF66"|3
|31.9
|2
|15.4
|1
|9.2
|0
|6
|-
|align="left"|The Mournes
|bgcolor="#99FF66"|32.4
|bgcolor="#99FF66"|2
|26.0
|2
|3.1
|0
|38.5
|1
|5
|- class="unsortable" class="sortbottom" style="background:#C9C9C9"
|align="left"| Total
|49.4
|17
|18.5
|6
|14.0
|4
|18.1
|3
|30
|-
|}

District results

Crotlieve

1985: 4 x SDLP, 2 x UUP, 1 x Independent Nationalist
1989: 5 x SDLP, 1 x UUP, 1 x Independent Nationalist
1985-1989 Change: SDLP gain from UUP

Newry Town

1985: 4 x SDLP, 1 x Sinn Féin, 1 x UUP, 1 x IIP
1989: 4 x SDLP, 1 x Sinn Féin, 1 x UUP, 1 x Independent Nationalist
1985-1989 Change: Independent Nationalist leaves IIP

Slieve Gullion

1985: 3 x SDLP, 2 x Sinn Féin
1989: 3 x SDLP, 2 x Sinn Féin
1985-1989 Change: No change

The Fews

1985: 3 x SDLP, 2 x UUP, 1 x Sinn Féin
1989: 2 x SDLP, 2 x UUP, 1 x Sinn Féin, 1 x DUP
1985-1989 Change: SDLP gain from DUP

The Mournes

1985: 2 x UUP, 1 x SDLP, 1 x DUP, 1 x Sinn Féin
1989: 2 x UUP, 2 x SDLP, 1 x Protestant Unionist
1985-1989 Change: SDLP gain from Sinn Féin, Protestant Unionist leaves DUP

References

Newry and Mourne District Council elections
Newry and Mourne